Pietro Frassi (before 1716–circa 1778) was an Italian painter of the late-Baroque period, active in his native Cremona.

Biography 
Frassi trained in Cremona with Angelo Massarotti from 1716, until the latter's death in 1723. he then moved to Rome. He painted a Miracle of St Vincent Ferrer for one of the chapels of the church of San Domenico, Cremona (church demolished in 1869).

References

Year of birth unknown
1778 deaths
Painters from Cremona
Italian Baroque painters
18th-century Italian painters
Italian male painters
Year of birth uncertain
18th-century Italian male artists